The adult edition of Pinoy Big Brother: Kumunity Season 10 premiered on Kapamilya Channel, Jeepney TV and A2Z on January 2, 2022. The second edition in the multi-part season, this edition featured contestants (known as Housemates) from the Adult Kumunity, which composes of civilians aged twenty through forty.

This edition saw the departure of host Toni Gonzaga from the show following her controversial appearance at the proclamation rally of presidential candidate Bongbong Marcos. Her exit marked the promotion of Bianca Gonzalez as the main host, assuming Gonzaga's duties for the remainder of the season alongside Robi Domingo.

The edition ended on March 12, 2022, following 70 days of competition. Nathan Juane and Isabel Laohoo were named as the Kumunity's Top 2, advancing to the final part of the season.

Production

Auditions
The online auditions opened on September 1, to auditionees aged 20 to 40. During the launch night, it was announced that the show received as total of 33,319 audition videos for the Adult Edition. Also announced was the extension of the submission of audition videos for the adults from October 16 to 31.

Online Bahay ni Kuya
Turned over from the previous edition, three additional civilian housemates were chosen from the Online Bahay ni Kuya Kumu campaign. There will be one winner for each of the three Kumunities: the Male, Female, and LGBTQIA+ Kumunities. The campaign was held from December 1, 2021, until January 1, 2022.

Andrei King, Kathleen Agir, and Roque Coting emerged as the winners of their respective Kumunities and were declared as official civilian housemates for this season.

Overview

Title card change
A new title card has been made for this edition. Since the theme for this edition is airport-themed, it differs from the previous edition which lacked a unique title card. Instead, this edition's title card features a moving airplane on a red and blue background with tickets displaying the hometowns of the civilian housemates, and the title card didn't mention the editions' title. That would change until the next edition began, which displayed their editions' name below the logo of the season.

The House
Prior to the release of this edition, only a small portion of the House's interior had been removed. The confession rooms' color has been changed from yellow to red, and only a few lines of their editions' theme song, "Pinoy Ako," are based on the neon lights displayed throughout the house.

Theme songs
The theme song for this edition is a new cover of the series' theme song, Pinoy Ako, now re-titled as Pinoy Tayo, by Rico Blanco and Jonathan Manalo which was originally sang by the band Orange and Lemons, which debuted on the Sunday variety show ASAP Natin 'To and then was sang on the opening night of this edition by Blanco with ex-celebrity housemates Alexa Ilacad and KD Estrada.

The eviction theme song for this edition is entitled "When I See You Again", written and performed by both Ilacad and Estrada.

Twists
 Pre-existing Relationships – Two of the adult housemates, Nathan and Raf Juane, who are siblings in real life, were tasked to serve their fellow housemates in the opening days of the Adult Batch while maintaining their relationship as siblings as a secret. If the siblings manage to keep their secret, they will be given their first weekly budget and one of them will be given a Nomination Immunity Pass.
 Ligtask Challenges – Nominated housemates will undergo several challenges to save themselves from evictions. These will serve as an eviction process for the nominated housemates.
 Houseplayers — This edition first featured houseplayers that can possibly claim Final Five spots by posing as late-entry housemates, through methods of sabotaging the House and threatening the housemates, and by accomplishing tasks given by Big Brother.
 The Secret Room — This edition also featured the adult housemates that were fake evicted for failing their Ligtask challenge. Instead of being actually evicted from the House, they were sent to a secret room by Big Brother until his given time.
 The Challengers — This edition featured the other four Final 5 housemates the possibility to snatch all the diamonds from its reigning diamond holder through a series of challenger tasks given by Big Brother.

Housemates

Housemates 

 Isabel Laohoo: Billed as the "Bubbly Boss Lady of Leyte", she is a businesswoman from the Eastern Visayan cities of Catbalogan and Tacloban known for her humility, wholesomeness, and leadership throughout the edition
 Nathan Juane: Known as the "Pursigidong Papiloto of Las Piñas" ("Determined Dad-Pilot of Las Piñas"), he is a flight instructor who displayed strong leadership and task performance. He is also the older brother of fellow housemate Raf, and initially introduced himself as a pilot named "Policarpio"
 Zach Guerrero: Called the "Smillenial Chamer of Aurora", he is a dentistry student who showed character growth during the course of the edition, especially during a heated confrontation with houseplayer Marky Miranda. He was also commonly paired with Thamara, and later Seham.
 Michael Ver Comaling: Billed as the "Mr. Pentastic of Leyte", he is an athlete and model notable for strong task performances, albeit was unpopular with the viewers as he was frequently described as a showoff, including scenes where he was visibly agitated after he was given 8 out of 8 possible nomination points, eavesdropping during a private conversation between Seham and Zach, and talking about the Juane siblings in a negative manner to Laziz
 Seham Daghlas: Called the "Brightminded Darling of Iloilo", she is a vlogger who was initially very popular with viewers due to her girl-next-door look and her engineering background. However, her popularity significantly declined in the latter part of the edition due to a sudden personality change, with some of her actions during the last 3 weeks of the edition being dubious and unpopular with the viewers, such as routinely favoring Michael over Zach (even flirting with him several times), below-par performances in tasks, and nominating Isabel, her closest friend in the house, on consecutive occasions.
 Raf Juane: Known as the "Ms. Beauty Kabo-guru of Las Piñas", she is a vlogger who is the sister of fellow housemate Nathan. She welcomed the first 8 housemates (not including herself and Nathan) to the PBB house as a flight attendant
 Laziz Rustamov: Known as the "Modelskarteng Breadwinner of Uzbekistan", he was mostly known for his diligence inside the Big Brother house and his close friendship with Nathan
 Roque Coting: Salesman from Davao de Oro notable for nominating other housemates due to them "umuutot" (farting)
 Gin Regidor: A cemetery vendor whose house was repaired as a reward for a weekly task after it was damaged by Typhoon Rai. She also showed leadership during the edition, particularly during the Drag Week
 Kathleen Agir-Zarandin: Caregiver from California whose temper got her in conflicts with several housemates, most notably with Aleck. Ironically, the duo would be in a relationship a few months after the edition ended
 Basti Macaraan: Service crew from Milan notable for pursuing a romantic relationship with Rica, including a scene of him serenading her by the pool area. He is the younger brother of Jaye
 Jaye Macaraan: Service crew from Milan mostly notable for having a romantic interest on fellow housemate Isabel. He is the older brother of Basti
 Aleck Iñigo: A delivery rider and an athlete who was most notable for his friendship with Michael and romantic pursuit of Rica, which lead to his early exit from the Big Brother house
 Rica Kriemhild: A theatre actress from Bologna, her stint in the edition was mostly notable for her relationships with male housemates, which was viewed unfavorably by viewers
 Andrei King: An influencer who was evicted early due to being automatically nominated as a result of failing to become a "boss" during the Capital Task week
 Thamara Alexandria: An actress known as the "Headstrong Hottie of Davao", she was the first evicted housemate of the edition after other housemates nominated her due to her allegedly being "mataray" (sassy or intimidating)

Houseplayers 
This season featured houseplayers that served as a challenge to the current housemates through methods such as sabotaging, harsh behaviors, acting as a threat to their status as a housemate, and competing with the housemates in the series of tasks intended to bring a set of housemates to the Final Five of each Kumunity. Most of the rules observed by the housemates still apply to the houseplayers.

The chosen houseplayers will then enter the house after they have successfully completed their mandatory quarantine and COVID-19 testing at a later date as part of the show's strict health protocols.

To determine the first two houseplayers of the season, two separate Kumu campaigns were held during the run of the Adult Edition. The top five winners will first undergo screening with the production team of the show, wherein one of them in each campaign will become a houseplayer and have the chance to become a co-host in PBB Kumulitan, the show's online companion show. As for the other four streamers that are not chosen, they will instead have a virtual appearance in the house—they explained the task that was given to them and to the housemates.

The first campaign was held on January 22 until January 27, 2022, while the second campaign was held on February 5 until February 10, 2022. Marky Miranda and Jannene Anne Nidoy were selected the first two houseplayers of the season.

 Marky Miranda is the season's first houseplayer. By impressing the housemates with his strong aura and personality at first, he successfully sabotaged the housemates by posing as a late-entry housemate, and then acting crazy and rebellious after he had a quick glimpse of the housemates. After drinking whiskey while Zach Guerrero was celebrating his birthday inside the house, Miranda had a confrontation with Guerrero, Nathan Juane, and Michael Ver Comaling. The next day, they apologized to each other.
 Jannene Anne "Ja" Nidoy is the season's second houseplayer. Entering the same day as Miranda, she was very shy to the housemates at first, but she immediately became friends with Raf Juane and Seham Daghlas after revealing her occupation as a vlogger and an influencer. Even though she and Miranda had a plan to sabotage the housemates, she handed the sabotage button over to Miranda alone and stayed with Juane during the confrontation by between fellow houseplayer Miranda and Guerrero by acting innocent—that she didn't know about it. She also had a close friendship with the Adult Final Five shortly after their exit.

Houseguests

Online Guesting 
 Day 121: Lyg Carillo, also known as Maria Christina, a drag queen, helped the housemates virtually in regards on their PBB Drag Race weekly task. She was tasked to practice the housemates' journey to being a drag queen and helped in creating their gowns.
 Day 122: Eva Le Queen, a drag queen, also helped the housemates in their PBB Drag Race task a day after Carillo's virtual guesting. She was tasked to judge the housemates' dance for their weekly task.
 Day 126: Brigiding, a drag queen, and former 737 regular housemate Dawn Chang were invited by Big Brother to judge the housemates' performance for their PBB Drag Race weekly task.

Physical Guesting 
 Day 99: First entered as a houseguest from the previous season, Brilliant Skin Essentials CEO Glenda Victorio returned to the Big Brother House again as a houseguest to assist the Adult housemates with their Big Online 10-dahan weekly task. Victorio stayed inside the house for two weeks until her exit on Day 112.

Tasks

Weekly tasks
{| class="wikitable" style="text-align:center; font-size:100%; line-height:18px;" width="100%"
|-
! style="width: 10%;" | Task No.
! style="width: 10%;" | Date given
! style="width: 70%;" | Task title and description
! style="width: 10%;" | Result
|-
|-
! 1
| January 1(Day 78)
| align="left" | Secret Siblings TaskA day before the entry of the other adult housemates, Nathan and Raf were given their first weekly task. They must make sure that for the entire week, the others will not find out that they are siblings.
| style="background:#99FF66;" | Passed
|-
! 2
| January 9(Day 86)
| align="left" | Build a HouseThree at a time, the housemates must build a six-feet house made by wall blocks using an improvised tools made by Aleck, Michael Ver, and Zach were isolated in the secret room. Meanwhile, the three isolated housemates must build the frame and roof of the house they built. The housemates must not use their hands to place the blocks—instead, they must use the tools provided by the three isolated housemates. To complete the task, the house must be stable within ten minutes. Once completed, the reward of a task is to re-build Gin's house that was devastated by Typhoon Odette.
| style="background:#99FF66;" | Passed
|-
! 3
| January 18(Day 95)
| align="left" | Pinoy Big Video ChallengeThe housemates were tasked to create three videos that will be posted on the show's social media accounts the day after the shooting of their videos. The housemates must reach at least 10,000 Kumu Klips of their videos that must be re-enacted by the Kumunity through Kumu to win this task.
| style="background:#FF6666;" |Failed
|-
! 4
| January 24(Day 101)
| align="left" | The Big Online 10-dahan (English: The Big Online Store)The housemates must form an online startup company to buy and sell the products that they have made through a series of tasks. The boss of their company can be replaced once voted by a majority; the incumbent boss within the end of the weekly task will be given immunity for the first nominations.

To win this task, they must earn a capital of a minimum of at least ₱75,000 and a maximum of ₱100,000 at the end of the week. The sales that they will earn at the end of this task will then be donated to the victims of Typhoon Odette.

The incumbent boss of the company must not participate on the capital tasks; only the board members and Glenda, the houseguest, can participate.

| style="background:#99FF66;" | Passed
|-
!5
|February 7(Day 115)
|align="left" | Love SacrificeIn connection to the upcoming Valentine's Day celebration inside the House, the housemates must create enough paper flowers to fill the big broken heart found in the center of the activity area.
| style="background:#99FF66;" | Passed
|-
!6
|February 13(Day 121)
|align="left" | PBB Drag RaceSimilar to RuPaul's Drag Race, the housemates must dress, act, and perform like drag queens and must do a dancing and lip-syncing challenge.

To complete this task, both groups must get at least 90% of the average score from the judges and from the Kumunity.Teams:Roqueens: Roque (leader), Isabel, Jaye, Nathan, Seham, and ZachGinwin: Gin (leader), Basti, Kathleen, Laziz, Michael Ver, and Raf

| style="background:#FF6666" | Failed
|-
!7
|February 23(Day 131)
|align="left" | Endurance ChallengeTo test their endurance, patience, and teamwork, the housemates must build 10 wooden pillars at the height of a circular base. Each wooden pillar is 1 foot high and each pillar has 2 wooden blocks that overlap. Once completed, they should lay a circle cover on top of it.

The five housemates inside the house (Laziz, Michael Ver, Nathan, Raf, and Seham) need to move the pillars by pulling the leash to transport it from the garden area to a stand located in front of the activity area, while the five other housemates that were fake-evicted during their Ligtask challenge (Gin, Isabel, Kathleen, Roque, and Zach) in the activity area do the same from one end of the activity area to the other. The housemates should not be too close to the base of the handle of the strap. There are fixed knots on the ropes as a sign of the correct distance between them.

If this task is considered successful, the housemates will not only receive their weekly budget, they will also be reunited with the fake-evicted housemates.
| style="background:#99FF66;" | Passed
|-
!8
|March 2(Day 138)
|align="left" | Stand UpThe housemates, including the houseplayers, must stand up for eight hours. The timer displayed on a TV located in the living area will start once the housemates stand when the weekly task leaders have announced the weekly task to the housemates. The timer will temporarily stop when a housemate sits, kneels, or leans during the duration of the weekly task, even when the housemates use the comfort room, or sits in the confession room, except for when they are called by Big Brother for their bed time.

When the housemates wake up in the morning during the duration of this weekly task, they have 5 seconds to immediately stand up after they hear the wake-up call as a sign that the timer will start ticking again. For the final night of this weekly task, both the housemates and the houseplayers were challenged to walk and stand constantly without giving up for a period amount of time, as said and set by Big Brother.

If the housemates and the houseplayers manage to stand for eight hours within the end of the week, they will be given their weekly budget; otherwise, if they don't, they will lose their weekly budget and must ration their food for their final week in the House.
| style="background:#99FF66;" | Passed
|-
!9
|March 6(Day 142)
|align="left" | Charity TaskServed as both a charity and a weekly task, five selected housemates must step on a color-coded part on the floor chosen by a digital roulette. Then, they must use a paddle to pass a ball to another housemate to a container provided in the play area.

One hundred pesos (₱100) will be added for every ball inserted in the container. They can shoot a maximum of 1,000 balls for this weekly task, possibly giving one hundred thousand pesos (₱100,000) if they shoot all of the balls to the chosen charity.

All of the earnings that they will accumulate after the end of this weekly task will be donated to St. Arnold Janssen Kalinga Foundation, Inc., the fifth beneficiary Kumunity for this season.
| style="background:#99FF66;" | Passed
|}

Notes

Adults
  The adult housemates were informed by Big Brother that the result of this weekly task will be displayed on the plasma TV; if the face of Karlito, the tarsier mascot of Kumu, is happy, signifies success; if sad, signifies failure. After revealing the result by revealing each part of the picture, a sad Karlito was shown, meaning that they have failed this weekly task.
  Kathleen was elected as the last boss of their company the day after completing their third capital task; thus making her safe from the nominations. This was in connection to their secret weekly task given to them on Day 101, making Andrei and Roque the first two nominees of the first nominations.
  Aleck and Rica were in the house when the task was performed. The episode for this task was aired on February 13, 2022.
  To determine the result of their weekly budget, they were given an hour to insert all of the flowers they have created and earned during the task given to Aleck, Basti, Kathleen, and Rica; they have successfully placed all of the flowers in the big broken heart in one hour, therefore giving them their weekly budget.
  Basti and Jaye were in the house when the task was performed. The episode for this task was aired on February 19, 2022.
  To get the average score of 90%, the Kumunity must drop at least 840,000 diamonds on Kumu to get 84% of their total score. Every 10,000 diamonds dropped is equivalent to 1% of their score. In total, the Kumunity had only dropped 233,700 diamonds.
  Gin, Isabel, Kathleen, Roque, and Zach helped the other housemates' as another paramdam (feeling) in their weekly task. Since they have successfully transferred the pillars, they were given their weekly budget and were reunited with the other five housemates.
  Raf and Laziz along with the houseplayers Marky and Ja were in the house when the task was performed. The episode for this task was aired on March 7, 2022, one day after the fifth eviction night.
  At the end of the weekly task, the housemates have successfully transferred 940 balls; this was equivalent to ₱94,000. All of the proceeds will be donated to St. Arnold Janssen Kalinga Foundation, Inc., the said Kumunity beneficiary for the weekly task.

Other tasks

Notes

Adults
  On Basti's behalf, Jaye and Nathan helped give the 7th and 8th questions respectively.

Challenges
Head of Household

Notes

Adults
 No Padaluck campaign was held on Kumu for this challenge—as of this date, the reason for this is still unknown. Zach was the first housemate to do this challenge as he was chosen by users through Kumunity Decides.

Ligtask
The Ligtask challenge was brought back specifically for this edition since it was last used on Connect.

Notes

  As part of a twist, the first two housemates to do this challenge will be saved instead of five.
  Even though only Laziz and Michael Ver were saved from this eviction as per the announcement by Big Brother, Isabel, Kathleen, and Roque were also saved from eviction as they have also successfully shot their balls on the container as part of the original rules before the twist occurred.
  The number of evictees for this task was never revealed as the three of them did not finish the challenge in time. Therefore, they were "evicted" from the house.

Group challenges
{| class="wikitable" style="text-align:center; font-size:100%; line-height:18px;" width="100%"
|-
! style="width: 10%;" | Challenge No.
! style="width: 10%;" | Date given
! style="width: 60%;" | Challenge title and description
! style="width: 10%;" | Winner
! style="width: 10%;" | Loser(s)
|-
!1
| January 31(Day 108)
| align="left" | Battle of the DuosThe housemates were informed that the house was split into two, it was also announced that the two pairs of leaders of their respective groups were related to each other; the two pairs of leaders being Raf and Nathan as Team Juane, and Basti and Jaye as Team Macaraan. The winning group at the end of this challenge will be given immunity; with the other group being the possible nominees for the second nominations.

To determine the members of each group, first, the remaining housemates will pick a random number from a bowl; the housemates who picked the first numbers will then select their pair. Then, in the activity area, the two pairs of leaders must inflate a balloon and then pass it to a basket by using their heads. The two housemates standing on a podium will then belong to the winning pair.

As the Macaraan Brothers have won the first three rounds, the remaining housemates (Isabel, Kathleen, Rica, Seham, Thamara, and Zach) were automatically assigned to Team Juane.Teams: Team Juane: Raf and Nathan (captains), Isabel, Kathleen, Rica, Seham, Thamara, and Zach
 Team Macaraan: Basti and Jaye (captains), Andrei, Aleck, Gin, Laziz, Michael Ver, and Roque

{| class="wikitable collapsible collapsed" style="text-align: center; font-size:90%; line-height:17px;" width="100%"
|-
|+The group challenges
|-
! style="width: 10%;" | Challenge No.
! style="width: 10%;" | Date given
! style="width: 50%;" | Challenge title and description
! style="background:#FFFFFF; width:15%;" | Team Juane
! style="background:#000000; color:white; width:15%;" | Team Macaraan
|-
! 1
| Feb. 2(Day 110)
| align="left" | Home Along Da Riles (English: Home Along the Rails)In every group, four housemates in pairs of two must ride into a cart using only their body movement in order to move the cart. Once they reach into a row of keys, a housemate must get a key and a plunger to help them go back faster and unlock a lock from a box that has six locks that contains an immunity necklace. The two members of a pair will get a key separately, and then both of the pair will get another key together. 
The group who unlocks their respective box first wins this round.
|style="background:#FBF373;"|Won|style="background:#FA8072;"|Lost
|-
! 2
| Feb. 3(Day 111)
| align="left" | Goal BoalSimilar to the Paralympic sport goalball, while wearing safety gear and eyepatches, the remaining pair of each group that did not participate on the first challenge must catch the ball of the other pair with the first pair lying on the floor and the other pair standing.
The pair standing must roll the ball into the floor, and the other pair must catch the ball using their hands. Points ranging from 2–3 points will be given to the standing pair if the other pair fails to catch the ball in one of the three areas of the other pairs' goal area. There will be two rounds that consists of two 10-minute half-times, for a total of 20 minutes for the pairs to play with.

The group pair with the most points garnered during the game wins this round.
|style="background:#FA8072;"|Lost
|style="background:#FBF373;"|Won|-
!colspan="3"|Final score
|style="background:#FA8072;"|16
|style="background:#FBF373;"|20|}

The winner for the group challenge was in favor for Team Macaraan for winning the tiebreaker in the second challenge.

|rowspan="2" style="background:#FBF373;"|Jaye, and Roque
|rowspan="2" style="background:#FA8072;"|Aleck, Basti, Gin, Laziz, and Team Juane
|-
! 2
| February 4–5(Days 112–113)
|align="left" | Plot TwistAs a twist, Big Brother informed the members of Team Macaraan that they have not claimed their immunity yet. He then gave a plot-twisting challenge to determine the final winners of the Battle of the Duos, and to also finally determine the possible nominees for the second nominations.

To test their strategies, creativity, and patience, all of the members of Team Macaraan must stack a tower of blocks within 30 minutes. They were allowed to create the mechanics for their respective games against each other. At the end of all games, only four winners of their respective games against each other will then be given immunity for the second nominations, making the other four vulnerable for eviction.

At the end of the group challenge, only Andrei, Jaye, Michael Ver, and Roque of Team Macaraan have claimed immunity for the second nominations; leaving their fellow team members Aleck, Basti, Gin, and Laziz, along with the members of Team Juane vulnerable for eviction.

Although Andrei won his battle against Aleck, he was evicted prior to the second nomination night, which rendered his immunity void.
|}

The Ten Million Diamonds Challenge

Final Five spot challenges

Nomination history
In each standard nomination round, every housemate is called to the confession room to nominate two of their housemates for eviction with the first nominee receiving 2 points and the other receiving 1 point. The housemates with the most nomination points (usually 3) will then face the public vote to determine the evictee for that round. However, Big Brother may automatically nominate a housemate for rule violations or a failure in a task. On the other hand, immunity may be awarded as a reward for accomplishing a task. Big Brother may forcibly evict a housemate for severe violations and a housemate may opt to voluntarily leave the house. In certain circumstances, the nomination process may be delayed as a result of a pending challenge or task.

Legend
  Housemate received immunity after becoming a Head of Household.
  Housemate received immunity after winning or finishing a task or challenge; or was exempt from the nominations due to being a new entrant.
  Housemate received immunity after winning the Ligtask challenge.
  Housemate was automatically nominated as a result of a twist or a rule violation.

Notes

  For being elected as the last boss of their company for their weekly task, Kathleen was awarded immunity for this eviction.
  As both Andrei and Roque failed to be elected as the boss of their company, thus failing in their weekly task resulting in their automatic nominations. Since there are two housemates that were both automatically nominated, only the highest-pointer will be included from the list of nominees for this week.
  This eviction is a double eviction wherein two nominees are set to be evicted.
  Andrei, Jaye, Michael Ver, and Roque won immunity after winning the twist given by Big Brother as part of the Battle of the Duos challenge. As nominees from the prior nominations, Andrei and Roque may only be safe for this round of nominations if they were to be saved in the first eviction night.
  Isabel used her Nomination Immunity Pass for this round, giving her immunity for this week.
  For this week, the housemates had a face to face nomination unlike the previous nomination rounds.
  This nomination round was divided into two groups; Team GinWin and Team RoQueens from the PBB Drag Race weekly task. Each housemate must be nominate a fellow member of their team.
  Nathan used his Nomination Immunity Pass for this round, giving him immunity for this week.
  This eviction is a triple eviction wherein three nominees are set to be evicted.
  Since almost all of them had left during the special nomination process, as the housemates that still stayed in the activity area after Big Brother announced his offer, Michael Ver and Nathan claimed the first two spots of the Final Five.
  Even though there was a special nomination process in this round of nominations, all nominations given there were declared void. 
  Seham was exempt for this eviction after she claimed the third Final Five spot.
  Isabel, Laziz, Raf, and Zach were given an automatic nomination after they failed to claim the third spot of the Final Five that was based on the task given to them by Big Brother.

 Powers 
On Day 93, Nathan and Raf were awarded one Nomination Immunity Pass as a reward for succeeding in their secret weekly task with the siblings themselves deciding whom between the two will receive the pass. They chose to give the pass to Nathan. Nathan used his power on the fourth round of nominations, guaranteeing him another week in the house by giving himself immunity.

On Day 113, Isabel was also awarded one Nomination Immunity Pass for having the most number of followers among her fellow housemates during their Follower Sprint task that was held from January 22 to February 4, 2022. Isabel used her power on the third round of nominations, guaranteeing her another week in the house by giving herself immunity.

Special nomination process 
A special nomination process occurred on Day 134, which was a deviation from the regular nominations in the confession room and from the normal face-to-face nominations.

For each housemate to nominate their fellow housemate for eviction, the housemate must nominate another housemate and then explain their reason why they nominated such housemate. Then, the housemate must place their picture into a holder that has a number of nomination points displayed on it. For the nomination to be considered valid, the housemate must need to bounce a ball from the six platforms provided to a container that depends on the number of nomination points that can be found below the platform. The housemate will then do the same task for the other point. Once the nominating housemate has successfully placed a ball in one or all of the containers, the nominated housemate will be given the nomination point assigned; a necklace bearing the point received will also be worn by the nominated housemate. If a housemate fails to place a ball in one or both of the containers on a round, the housemate must repeat the process again until all the balls in the container will be used. The two (or more of there is a tie) highest pointers after three rounds or more until it is determined will then be considered as the final nominees for eviction.

On the second round, Big Brother noticed that they were not taking the task seriously; so, he made an offer to the housemates: to either stay in the Activity Area if they want to proceed to the next round, or leave if they don't want to. This offer tested the housemates' authenticity towards their fellow housemates.

As the housemates that remained in the Activity Area after Big Brother announced his offer to the housemates, Nathan and Michael Ver secured their spots on the Final Five of their Kumunity.

Legend
 Housemate became part of the Final Five of their Kumunity.
 Housemate has finished shooting all of the balls in all of the containers and made their nominations valid.
 Housemate failed to shoot a ball in all of the containers in that round and made their nominations invalid.

For housemates that only placed one ball during a round:
 name means that a ball was placed in the housemates' chosen container, making their nomination valid.
 means that no ball was placed in the housemates' chosen container, making their nomination invalid.

Kumunity beneficiaries
 Isang Daan sa Pagtutulungan — The adult housemates, while doing The Big Online 10-dahan weekly task, will have to sell their products as proceeds from the sale will be donated to ABS-CBN Foundation through Tulong-Tulong sa Pag-ahon: Operation Odette, as part of Isang Daan sa Pagtutulungan, a 100-day series of fundraising activities initiated by ABS-CBN and ABS-CBN Foundation aimed at helping 100,000 families affected by Typhoon Odette. As of February 4, 2022, the housemates collected two hundred forty-nine thousand pesos (₱249,000) to be given to this Kumunity, as announced by main host Bianca Gonzalez during the first eviction night.
 St. Arnold Janssen Kalinga Foundation, Inc. – At Big Brother's request, the adult housemates were asked to think of ideas of which beneficiary they can help. After a round of discussions, they decided to help a particular Kumunity focusing on the impoverished and the homeless; however, they let Big Brother select such beneficiary as they do not know what particular charitable organization focuses on the aforementioned concerns. A day after, Big Brother announced to the adult housemates that the St. Arnold Janssen Kalinga Foundation, Inc. is their next Kumunity in need. A weekly task and charity task was given to Nathan and Michael Ver where the housemates must step on a color-coded part on the floor chosen by a digital roulette, and must use a paddle to pass a ball to another housemate to a container provided in the play area. One hundred pesos (₱100) will be added for every ball inserted in the container. They can shoot a maximum of 1,000 balls for this weekly task, possibly giving one hundred thousand pesos (₱100,000) if they shoot all of the balls to the chosen charity. In the end, the housemates successfully completed their task after shooting 940 balls, giving the housemates the opportunity to give ninety-four thousand pesos (₱94,000) to this Kumunity.

S-E voting system result

Controversies and criticisms

Inappropriate remarks 
Michael Ver Comaling received heavy backlash from viewers for allegedly talking about the Juane siblings, Nathan and Raf, behind their backs in a bad manner to fellow housemate Laziz Rustamov, who is a close friend of the said siblings and was uncomfortable with Comaling's actions towards them. Comaling told Rustamov that he gave Raf 2 points as an act of vengeance since she had given him 2 points during the last two nominations, while he also questioned Nathan's religiousness, using it to "hide things".

Michael Ver-Seham-Zach love triangle 
In the final three weeks of the edition, a love triangle emerged between Michael Ver Comaling, Seham Daghlas, and Zach Guerrero. Daghlas admitted her feelings towards Guerrero while also admitting her feelings towards Comaling a few days after, causing her to get backlash online, as she began favoring Comaling over Guerrero in the final 3 weeks of the edition, such as a scene where Daghlas got drunk on Guerrero's birthday celebration but asked for Comaling's help, and talking to Comaling after she had a "heart-to-heart" conversation with Guerrero that Comaling was seen eavesdropping on. The love triangle caused both Comaling and Daghlas, especially the latter, to decline in favorability from the viewers.

References

Kumunity season 10 adult edition
2022 Philippine television seasons